Paracanthella marginemaculata is a species of tephritid or fruit flies in the genus Paracanthella of the family Tephritidae.

Distribution
Asia.

References

Tephritinae
Insects described in 1851
Diptera of Asia